The Big Easy is a 1986 American neo-noir romantic thriller film directed by Jim McBride and written by Daniel Petrie Jr. The film stars Dennis Quaid, Ellen Barkin, John Goodman, and Ned Beatty. The film was both set and shot on location in New Orleans, Louisiana.

The film was later adapted for a television series for two seasons on the USA Network (1996–1997).

Plot
New Orleans police lieutenant Remy McSwain investigates the murder of a local mobster, leading police to suspect a war between two crime families.

Anne Osborne, a state district attorney, arrives to investigate alleged police corruption. After seeing firsthand some unorthodox practices by Remy, Anne accuses him of being on the take. He argues that she lacks an understanding of how the system works in New Orleans for police.

Despite Anne's suspicious and apprehensive feelings towards Remy, they form a romantic relationship. When Remy is allegedly caught accepting a payoff in an Internal Affairs sting, a furious Anne is tasked with prosecuting him. With Remy's fellow officers' assistance, crucial evidence is destroyed and suppressed; the charges are dropped, at which point Anne, now clued in, is conflicted over her personal feelings for Remy and her duty to uphold the law.

It is later revealed that Jack Kellom, Remy's boss, who is his mother's fiancé, and detectives De Soto and Dodge Roe Smith are behind the spate of murders to cover their involvement in heroin smuggling that they operate from a boat yard. Kellom goes to the boat and is confronted by De Soto and Dodge. Kellom suggests getting rid of the drugs, but De Soto shoots Kellom. Remy and Anne arrive and are confronted by De Soto and Dodge, and a shootout ensues, resulting in De Soto being shot by a fatally wounded Kellom. Remy shoots Dodge with a flare gun, starting a fire. Remy and Anne barely escape before the boat explodes.

The final scene shows Remy carrying Anne into her apartment, then the two dancing; it appears they were just married.

Cast

Dennis Quaid as Detective Lieutenant Remy McSwain
Ellen Barkin as A.D.A. Anne Osborne
Ned Beatty as Captain Jack Kellom
John Goodman as Detective Sergeant Andre DeSoto
Lisa Jane Persky as Detective McCabe
Ebbe Roe Smith as Detective Ed Dodge
Tom O'Brien as Bobby McSwain
Charles Ludlam as Lamar Parmentel
Grace Zabriskie as Mama
Marc Lawrence as Vinnie "The Cannon" DiMotti
Solomon Burke as Daddy Mention
Gailard Sartain as Chef Paul
Jim Garrison as Judge Jim Garrison
Bob Kearney as Detective Sergeant Kearney

Production
Filming took 50 days and the lead actors rehearsed three weeks before the start of principal photography.

The original title of the script was "Windy City", and was set in Chicago. The title was briefly changed to "Nothing But The Truth".

Well-known New Orleans district attorney Jim Garrison makes a cameo appearance as a judge. Garrison became known for his Kennedy assassination conspiracy theories and his own investigation into JFK's murder from New Orleans in the 1960s.

City of New Orleans
The city of New Orleans and its atmospherics function as a protagonist in the film. This is evident from the beginning of the film: The opening is an aerial shot of the New Orleans bayou and the cajun band BeauSoleil plays "Zydeco Gris Gris" on the soundtrack (title sequence).

The producers used well-known locations such as Tipitina's, Antoine's, Blaine Kern's warehouse full of Mardi Gras parade floats, and a French Quarter strip joint, to flesh out the mood of the film.

Reception

Box-office
The film had a limited opening on August 21, 1987, and grossed $353,259. It widened a week where its gross was $3,626,031 from 1,138 screens and the total receipts for the run were $17,685,307. In its widest release the film was featured in 1,219 theaters. The motion picture was in circulation five weeks.

Critical response
Roger Ebert, film critic of the Chicago Sun-Times, lauded the film, and wrote, "The Big Easy is one of the richest American films of the year. It also happens to be a great thriller. I say 'happens,' because I believe the plot of this movie is only an excuse for its real strength: the creation of a group of characters so interesting, so complicated and so original they make a lot of other movie people look like paint-by-number characters."

Sheila Benson, writing for the Los Angeles Times, wrote, "Screenwriter Daniel Petrie Jr. sets up the conflict, and director Jim McBride fleshes it out with devastating, sexy assurance..."

Film critic Vincent Canby was a bit tougher on the film, and wrote, "Remy and Anne are made for each other, or would have been if The Big Easy were the sophisticated comedy it could have been...[the film] was directed by Jim McBride who one day is going to come up with a commercial movie that works all the way through, and not just in patches."

The review aggregator Rotten Tomatoes reported that 89% of critics gave the film a positive review, based on 37 reviews, with an average rating of 7.5/10. The critics consensus reads, "Loaded with atmosphere and drenched in the sizzling chemistry between Dennis Quaid and Ellen Barkin, The Big Easy remains one of the strongest—and steamiest—thrillers of the 1980s." On Metacritic — which assigns a weighted mean score — the film has a score of 77 out of 100 based on 10 critics, indicating "generally favorable reviews". Audiences polled by CinemaScore gave the film an average grade of "B" on an A+ to F scale.

The film is praised for the accuracy of Quaid's Cajun accent, which he meticulously researched in preparation for the role. However, residents of the New Orleans area were not so pleased, referring to it as "cringe-inducing."

Accolades

Wins
 1987: Cognac Festival du Film Policier, Cognac, France: Grand Prix
 1987: Valladolid International Film Festival: Best Actor, Dennis Quaid
 1988: Independent Spirit Awards: Best Male Lead Dennis Quaid
 1988: Sant Jordi Awards: Best Foreign Actress, Ellen Barkin
 1988: Anthony Award: Best Movie

Nominations
 1988: Independent Spirit Awards: Best Director, Jim McBride; Best Feature, Stephen J. Friedman
 1988: Casting Society of America: Artios Award; Best Casting for Feature Film, Drama, Lynn Stalmaster and David Rubin
 1988: Edgar Allan Poe Awards: Edgar; Best Motion Picture, Daniel Petrie Jr.

Others
The film is recognized by American Film Institute in these lists:

 2002: AFI's 100 Years...100 Passions—Nominated
 2008: AFI's 10 Top 10:
 Nominated Mystery Film

Distribution
The film was first shown in 1986 at various film festivals including the Cognac Festival du Film Policier, the Davao City Film Festival in the Philippines, the Valladolid International Film Festival in Spain, and the Sundance Film Festival before being picked up for distribution. According to Robert Redford, founder of Sundance, The Big Easy was the first film sold at the festival. Redford tells of dragging David Puttnam, then the head of Columbia Pictures, to see the film. After the screening, Puttnam decided to pick up the movie for distribution. The Big Easy was released as The Big Crackdown in the Philippines by Season Films and Jemah Films on November 5, 1988.

Home media
The Big Easy was first released on VHS in 1988 by HBO Video. On February 2, 1999, a video and DVD of the film were released on the Trimark label as part of the label's "Gold Reel Collection." In 2004, it was re-released on DVD by Cinema Club.

Television adaptation
The film inspired its television series, which premiered on the USA Cable Network August 11, 1996. Tony Crane played McSwain and Susan Walters played Anne Osbourne. There were approximately 35 episodes broadcast over two seasons. Although Daniel Petrie Jr. (who wrote the screenplay to the original film) was credited as an executive producer of the series, Petrie has stated that he was "not at all" involved in the series, receiving only "a credit and money".

Soundtrack
With the action taking place in New Orleans, and the main protagonist's Cajun family background (Remy McSwain), the producers of the film used cajun, zydeco, R&B, and gospel music in the soundtrack.

An original motion picture soundtrack album was assembled by label executive Danny Holloway and released in 1987 on the Island label. The album contains twelve tracks including "Tipitina", played by New Orleans pianist Professor Longhair (1974 re-recording from his album Rock 'n' Roll Gumbo in the substantially remixed version produced for its 1985 CD reissue), the New Orleans anthem "Iko Iko," by The Dixie Cups, and a ballad, "Closer to You," written and performed by actor Dennis Quaid who also performs the song in the film. Other performers on the album include Terrance Simien,  BeauSoleil, Buckwheat Zydeco, Dewey Balfa, Aaron Neville and The Neville Brothers.

References

External links

 
 
 
 
 The Big Easy draft script from Daily Script, for educational purposes
 The Big Easy film review by Siskel & Ebert at YouTube
 The Big Easy film trailer at YouTube

1986 films
1986 independent films
1980s crime comedy films
American crime comedy films
American independent films
Columbia Pictures films
Fictional portrayals of the New Orleans Police Department
Films directed by Jim McBride
Films set in Louisiana
Films set in New Orleans
Films shot in New Orleans
American neo-noir films
American police detective films
Films scored by Brad Fiedel
Films with screenplays by Daniel Petrie Jr.
1986 comedy films
1980s English-language films
1980s American films